Susan Gerbic (born 1962) is an American studio photographer who became known as a scientific skepticism activist, mostly for exposing people claiming to be mediums. A columnist for Skeptical Inquirer, she is the co-founder of Monterey County Skeptics and a fellow of the Committee for Skeptical Inquiry.

Early life and education 
The youngest of three children, Gerbic was raised as a Southern Baptist in Salinas, California. Her father was born in 1918 in Euclid, Ohio, to parents from Slovenia; he served during World War II and after the war went to live in Salinas. Gerbic attended Freemont Elementary, El Sausal Junior High School, and Alisal High School in Salinas, graduating in 1980. She became an atheist in her junior year. After high school, she studied at Hartnell College, also in Salinas, obtaining AAs in general studies in 1993 and history in 1998, while working and raising two sons. In 2002, she was awarded a BA in Social & Behavioral Studies by California State University, Monterey Bay.

Career and activism

Photography
Gerbic worked at Lifetouch, a portrait studio in JC Penney in the Northridge Mall in Salinas, from 1982 for 34 years, including as manager. She retired in 2016 when the studio closed.

Guerrilla Skeptics

Gerbic first read Skeptical Inquirer when she was 33, and in 2000, she attended the Skeptic's Toolbox workshop in Eugene, Oregon. In 2009, she went to Mexico on an "Amazing Adventure" cruise organized by the Canadian stage magician and skeptic James Randi; according to the New York Times, Randi used a MacArthur grant to fund "annual ship cruises filled with skeptics".

Much of Gerbic's activism has consisted of organizing sting operations against people claiming to be mediums. She and a group of volunteers calling themselves "Guerrilla Skeptics" would set up fake Facebook profiles, then visit mediums claiming to be receiving messages from the subjects of the profiles. Gerbic's team would record the session and post the evidence online.

In 2010, Gerbic founded "Guerrilla Skepticism on Wikipedia" (GSoW), a group of editors who create and improve Wikipedia articles that reflect scientific skepticism. The New York Times Magazine reported in February 2019, in an interview with Gerbic, that GSoW had 144 editors who had worked on nearly 900 Wikipedia pages.

Awards and honors 
 "In the Trenches" award at the Committee for Skeptical Inquiry's 2012 Skeptic's Toolbox workshop
 "James Randi Award for Skepticism in the Public Interest" at The Amaz!ng Meeting 2013
 2017 Award from James Randi Educational Foundation (shared with "her team of 'guerrilla skeptics'")
 Appointed fellow of the Committee for Skeptical Inquiry, February 2018
 2019 Balles Award for Critical Thinking, Center for Inquiry

Personal life 
Gerbic married Robert Forsyth in 1983. The couple had two sons, and the marriage ended in 2002. As of August 2018, Gerbic was in a relationship with the mentalist Mark Edward. They met in 2009 on one of James Randi's skeptics' cruises to Mexico; Edward was working on the ship as part of the entertainment.

In 2013, Gerbic discovered she had breast cancer after she and a colleague at Lifetouch studios scheduled mammograms in response to Angelina Jolie undergoing a preventive mastectomy. By December that year, Gerbic had completed 20 weeks of chemotherapy for stage II cancer and, by March 2014, 33 radiation treatments. Gerbic continued to work throughout the treatment, and her follow-up mammogram revealed no cancer. She said the experience had made her tougher.

See also 
 What's The Harm?

References

Further reading 

 Guerrilla Skepticism on Wikipedia blog
 "Author: Susan Gerbic". Skeptical Inquirer.

1962 births
Activists from California
American atheists
American bloggers
American podcasters
American skeptics
American Wikimedians
American women bloggers
American women photographers
American women podcasters
American women writers
Critics of alternative medicine
Critics of parapsychology
Living people
People from Salinas, California
Wikipedia people
21st-century American women artists
American people of Slovenian descent